Culprit is an American heavy metal band formed in Seattle, Washington, in 1981 by vocalist Jeff L'Heureux, guitarists John DeVol and Kjartan Kristoffersen, bassist Scott Earl, and drummer Bud Burrill. Their debut album Guilty as Charged was first released through Shrapnel Records in 1983 and later again through Hellion Records in 2000. The band broke up in 1985 and each of its members moved on to other endeavors.

History

Formation (1981–1985) and Guilty as Charged 
Culprit was the result of a merger between two Seattle area bands named Orpheus and Amethyst in 1981. Guitarist John DeVol, bassist Scott Earl, and drummer Bud Burrill played in Orpheus while vocalist Jeff L'Heureux and guitarist Kjartan Kristoffersen were in Amethyst. These five musicians first came together when their respective bands played at a mutual gig. They later got together with plans on forming a new band, which they ultimately named Culprit. This new band got their first taste of success in 1982 when their debut song "Players" was selected on Shrapnel Records' U.S. Metal, Vol. 2 compilation. Shortly afterward, Culprit signed a proper recording contract with Shrapnel and began work on their debut album.

In 1983, Culprit released their first and only studio album thus far Guilty as Charged to much critical acclaim. Eduardo Rivadavia of AllMusic gave the album four and a half stars, calling it "a lost gem of American metal from the 1980s, and well worth seeking out for fans of other bands from the period." Scott Earl left the band in 1984 and the band broke up soon after.

Post-break-up and reunion (1986–present) 
Following the break-up, L'Heureux became lead vocalist for the band Mistrust while Kristoffersen and Earl joined the band TKO, appearing on their third album Below the Belt, then relocated to Hollywood, California and formed The Bang Gang, which released Love Sells... in 1990 on Sinclair/MCA Records.

In 2000, Guilty as Charged was re-released on CD for the first time through Hellion Records. The original lineup has reunited on various occasions for one-off shows, most recently in 2001. In 2005, they released a compilation album of rarities titled Innocent 'Til Proven Guilty.

Throughout the 2010s, the band has reformed for several reunion shows and undergone many lineup changes with founding bassist Scott Earl as the only constant member. In 2019, they released Guilty as Charged Live under the lineup of Earl, vocalist Mino Mereu, guitarist Patrick Abbate, and drummer Saul Ashley. As of 2021, the band have announced through their Facebook page that they are working on their long-awaited sophomore album tentatively titled Layin' Down the Law.

Members 

Current line-up
Scott Earl – bass guitar
Gabriel Colon – vocals
Fred Aching – drums
P.J. Toyne – guitar

Former members
Jeff L'Heureux – vocals
John DeVol – guitar
Kjartan Kristoffersen – guitar
Bud Burrill – drums
Steve Nations – vocals
Tim Kleiman – guitar
Saul Ashley – drums
Mino Mereu – vocals
Lamar Little – drums
Patrick Abbate – guitar

Discography 
Studio albums

Live albums

Compilation albums

Other appearances

References 

Heavy metal musical groups from Washington (state)
Musical groups from Seattle
Musical groups established in 1981
Musical groups disestablished in 1985
Musical groups reestablished in 2010
Musical quintets
Musical quartets
Shrapnel Records artists